Crato may refer to:

Places

Crato, Portugal
Crato, Ceará, Brazil

People
Crato, Count of Nassau-Saarbrücken (1621–1642), German nobleman
Louis Crato, Count of Nassau-Saarbrücken (1663– 1713), German nobleman
Johannes Crato von Krafftheim (1519–1585), German humanist and physician, 
 Pseudo-Crato, the supposed author of a history of the apostles Simon and Judas
Nuno Crato (born 1952), Portuguese mathematician and economist

Other uses
 Crato Formation, a geological formation of Early Cretaceous age in northeastern Brazil's Araripe Basin